Miguel Angel Martínez may refer to:

Miguel Ángel Martínez-González (born 1957), Spanish physician, epidemiologist, and nutrition researcher
Miguel Ángel Martínez Martínez (born 1940), Spanish politician
Miguel Ángel Martínez (Argentine footballer) (born 1984), Argentinean retired footballer
Miguel Ángel Martínez (Spanish footballer) (born 1995)
Miguel Ángel Martínez (swimmer) (born 1984), Spanish swimmer
Miguel Ángel Martínez Torres, Spanish cyclist

See also
Miguel Martinez (disambiguation)